The Grant Transit Authority is a public transit operator in Grant County, Washington. It operates 13 routes, including intercity services that converge in the city of Moses Lake.

History

Grant Transit Authority began as a demonstration project with 4 buses in November 1995. The project, deemed a success after one year, led to a November 1996 vote to establish a public transportation benefit area (PTBA) to fund a permanent system. The vote passed, creating a 0.2 percent sales tax and allowing regular service to begin and expand the following year.

The PTBA boundaries were expanded in 1998 to include Quincy, which had opted out of the 1996 vote, thus encompassing all of Grant County. The Grant Transit Authority previously partnered with a local non-profit organization, People for People, for operations but became independent in October 2013.

In 2015, construction began on a new transit center in downtown Moses Lake. The transit center opened on August 1, 2017, with an indoor waiting area, a customer service desk, and several bays. The Grant Transit Authority debuted inter-county commuter services during the same month, connecting Moses Lake to Ellensburg and Wenatchee on weekdays. Several routes were consolidated in a major service change that took effect in April 2019.

Fares

Regular Fare: $1.00
Reduced/Senior: $0.50

Monthly Passes
Adult: $25
Student: $20
Reduced/Senior: $15

References

External links

Bus transportation in Washington (state)
Transit agencies in Washington (state)
Transportation in Grant County, Washington